Flipside or flip side may refer to:

 The B-side of a gramophone record's A-side and B-side

Print
Flipside (fanzine), a punk rock fanzine and record publisher active 1977–2001
Flipside (comics), a villain in Marvel Comics
"The Flip Side", a section of The Columbus Dispatch newspaper
"FlipSide", a teen section of the Charleston Gazette newspaper
Flipside, a teen magazine from the Institution of Engineering and Technology
The Flipside, a satirical school newspaper from Deerfield High School (Illinois)

Music

Songs
"Flipside" (The Click Five song), a song by The Click Five from their 2007 album Modern Minds and Pastimes
"Flipside", a song by Everything but the Girl from their 1996 album Walking Wounded
"Flipside", a song by rapper Freeway from his 2003 album Philadelphia Freeway and Bad Boys II (soundtrack) 
"Flipside", a 2014 song by Lana Del Rey
"The Flipside", a song by Moloko from their album I Am Not a Doctor

Other
Flipside, a music video program of MTV Asia and IBC-13
DJ Flipside, a radio host on Chicago station WBBM-FM
 Flipside (album), a 2005 album by jazz musician Jeff Lorber

Other uses
BFI Flipside, a series of DVD and Blu-ray film editions
Burning Flipside, a Texas arts festival descended from Burning Man
Flipside (video game), a platform computer game mod developed upon the Source engine
Flipside (Canadian TV program), a 1974 Canadian journalistic music television program
Flipside (Australian TV series), a 2002 Australian television comedy series
Flipside TV, a series broadcast by Channel 4, Nation 277, and Paramount in the United Kingdom
Flipside, a town in the video game Super Paper Mario
Flipside film festival, a 2008 international film festival held in Plymouth, UK
Hoffman Estates v. The Flipside, Hoffman Estates, Inc., a case heard by the U.S. Supreme Court and sometimes referred to as "Flipside"
Flipside, a webcomic by Brion Foulke

See also
Flipsyde
fripSide
Opposite (disambiguation)
Reverse (disambiguation)
The Other Side (disambiguation)